The Coat of arms of Tolima is the coat of arms of the Colombian Department of Tolima. The emblem was adopted by Law of December 7, 1815 ordained by the United Chambers of the Mariquita Province and sanctioned by José León Armero, the governor and general in command. In 1861 the coat of arms was adopted for the Sovereign State of Tolima by Decree of April 12 of the same year by General Tomas Cipriano de Mosquera and officially established on September 7.

References

External links
 San Sebastian de Mariquita: Coat of arms of the Department of Tolima

Tolima
Tolima Department
Tolima Department
Tolima Department
Tolima Department
Tolima Department
Tolima Department
Tolima Department